Memphis High School is a public high school located in the city of Memphis, Texas, USA and classified as a 2A school by the UIL.  It is a part of the Memphis Independent School District located in central Hall County.   In 2015, the school was rated "Met Standard" by the Texas Education Agency.

Athletics
The Memphis Cyclones compete in these sports - 

Volleyball, Cross Country, Football, Basketball, Powerlifting, Golf, Tennis, Track & Baseball

State titles
Boys Basketball - 
1949(1A)
Football - 
1991(1A)
Boys Golf - 
1966(1A), 1995(2A), 2002(2A), 2003(1A)
Girls Golf - 
2007(1A), 2012(1A), 2013(1A), 2015(2A)
Boys Track - 
1976(1A)

Notable alumni
Jack English Hightower (Class of 1944) was a former Democratic U.S. representative from Texas's 13th congressional district.
Blues Boy Willie (Class of 1964) is an African-American electric blues singer and harmonica player

References

External links
Memphis ISD website

Public high schools in Texas
Schools in Texas